The Ural field mouse (Apodemus uralensis) is a species of rodent in the family Muridae. It is also known as the pygmy field mouse. It is found in Armenia, Austria, Azerbaijan, Belarus, Bulgaria, China, Croatia, Czech Republic, Estonia, Georgia, Hungary, Kazakhstan, Latvia, Liechtenstein, Lithuania, Mongolia, Montenegro, Poland, Romania, Russian Federation, Serbia, Slovakia, Turkey and Ukraine.

References

External links 

Apodemus
Rats of Asia
Rodents of Europe
Rodents of China
Mammals of Russia
Mammals described in 1811
Taxonomy articles created by Polbot
Taxa named by Peter Simon Pallas